Shadows of Death is a 1945 American Western film directed by Sam Newfield.

Premise
Billy Carson tracks down the murderer of a man carrying news of the railroad traveling through the town of Red Rock, where Fuzzy Q. Jones is Justice of the Peace, town marshal, barber and horse doctor.

Cast 
Buster Crabbe as Billy Carson
Al St. John as Fuzzy Q. Jones
Dona Dax as Babs Darcy
Charles King as Steve Landreau (gang boss)
Karl Hackett as Dave Hanlely (murder victim)
Eddie Hall as Clay Kincaid
Frank Ellis as Henchman Frisco
John L. Cason as Henchman Butch

See also
The "Billy the Kid" films starring Buster Crabbe: 
 Billy the Kid Wanted (1941)
 Billy the Kid's Round-Up (1941)
 Billy the Kid Trapped (1942)
 Billy the Kid's Smoking Guns (1942)
 Law and Order (1942) 
 Sheriff of Sage Valley (1942) 
 The Mysterious Rider (1942)
 The Kid Rides Again (1943)
 Fugitive of the Plains (1943)
 Western Cyclone (1943)
 Cattle Stampede (1943)
 The Renegade (1943)
 Blazing Frontier (1943)
 Devil Riders (1943)
 Frontier Outlaws (1944)
 Valley of Vengeance (1944)
 The Drifter (1944) 
 Fuzzy Settles Down (1944)
 Rustlers' Hideout (1944)
 Wild Horse Phantom (1944)
 Oath of Vengeance (1944)
 His Brother's Ghost (1945) 
 Thundering Gunslingers (1945)
 Shadows of Death (1945)
 Gangster's Den (1945)
 Stagecoach Outlaws (1945)
 Border Badmen (1945)
 Fighting Bill Carson (1945)
 Prairie Rustlers (1945) 
 Lightning Raiders (1945)
 Terrors on Horseback (1946)
 Gentlemen with Guns (1946)
 Ghost of Hidden Valley (1946)
 Prairie Badmen (1946)
 Overland Riders (1946)
 Outlaws of the Plains (1946)

References

External links 

 (alternative link)

1945 films
1940s English-language films
American black-and-white films
Billy the Kid (film series)
1945 Western (genre) films
Producers Releasing Corporation films
American Western (genre) films
Films directed by Sam Newfield
1940s American films